The UCI Track Cycling World Championships – Women's madison is the world championship madison event held annually at the UCI Track Cycling World Championships. Although a storied and iconic event in male track cycling, it was first held for women only at the 2017 championships in Hong Kong, having been added to the Olympic programme for 2020.

Kirsten Wild and Amy Pieters have won the event three times, the only riders to have done so.

Medalists

Medal table

External links
Track Cycling World Championships 2016–1893 bikecult.com
World Championship, Track, Madison, Elite cyclingarchives.com

 
Women's madison
Lists of UCI Track Cycling World Championships medalists
Women's madison